Charles Spooner (died 1767) was an Irish mezzotint engraver, who worked in London towards the end of his life.

Life
He was born in County Wexford, and became a pupil of John Brooks. He came to London before 1756. There he mainly worked making copies of plates by other engravers, for Robert Sayer and Carington Bowles, the printsellers.

Spooner died in London on 5 December 1767, his life being shortened by drink, and was buried beside his friend James Macardell, in Hampstead churchyard.

Works
In Dublin Spooner executed portraits of William Hogarth (1749), Anthony Malone, Samuel Madden (1752), and Thomas Prior (1752). Later he engraved some further portraits, some from his own drawings, as well as genre subjects after Rembrandt, Teniers, Schalken, Mercier, and others.

References

Attribution

Year of birth missing
1767 deaths
18th-century engravers
Irish engravers
People from County Wexford